Goulceby is a village and civil parish in the East Lindsey district of Lincolnshire, England.

Goulceby village is conjoined with the hamlet of Asterby, both marked on local road signs as one settlement, Goulceby with Asterby, although the two form separate civil parishes.

Goulceby was the birthplace of William Marwood, hangman, who invented the "long drop" system of execution.

Community
Until 2012 local democracy took the form of the 'Asterby, Goulceby & Ranby Grouped Parish Council', but at the request of the people of Ranby, it was split to form the 'Asterby & Goulceby Parish Council' and the 'Ranby Parish Meeting'.

The Ecclesiastical parishes are also still separate, as Asterby, Goulceby and Ranby.  All three are part of the Asterby group of the Deanery of Horncastle.

References

External links

Villages in Lincolnshire
Civil parishes in Lincolnshire
East Lindsey District